Yuqing County is a county in the northeast of Guizhou province, China. It is under the administration of the prefecture-level city of Zunyi.

Climate

References

County-level divisions of Guizhou
Administrative divisions of Zunyi